Old Jupiter School (aka  Jupiter Elementary School, Historic Jupiter School) is a historic landmark located in Jupiter, Florida.  The school was constructed in 1927 to serve approximately 100 white-only students and served as the area's primary school until 1965.

The school is owned and managed by the Palm Beach County School Board, which restored the interior of the building in 2006 at a cost of $6.4 million. The county continues to discuss more renovations in the future.

The building was designed by architect William Manly King, who designed all Palm Beach County schools built in the 1920s. The facility is architecturally described as a Mediterranean Revival.

See also
 Primary education in the United States
 School segregation in the United States
 Harder Hall in Highlands County, Florida, NRHP listed
 Pahokee High School in Palm Beach County, Florida, NRHP listed
 Osborne School (1948) in Lake Worth, Florida. 
 Palm Beach Junior College (1927), 
 Old West Palm Beach National Guard Armory

References

American architectural styles
Schools in Florida
Jupiter, Florida
Mediterranean Revival architecture in Florida
Mediterranean Revival architecture
Primary education
Revival architectural styles
Segregated schools in the United States
Segregated schools
Segregation